The following is a list of The Citadel basketball seasons. The Citadel, The Military College of South Carolina is a member of the Southern Conference of the NCAA Division I.  The Citadel did not field a team from 1901–1912.  The Citadel has won one conference championship, the 1927 Southern Intercollegiate Athletic Association Tournament, but has never participated in the NCAA tournament.  The Bulldogs only appearance in a postseason tournament was during the 2008–09 season, when they participated in the 2009 CollegeInsider.com Postseason Tournament, falling in the first round to eventual champion Old Dominion.

References

Citadel
Citadel Bulldogs basketball seasons